Arnoldo Mondadori (2 November 1889 – 8 June 1971) was a noted Italian publisher.

Mondadori was born at Poggio Rusco, Mantua and died in Milan.

His publishing house (Arnoldo Mondadori Editore) is today the largest in Italy.

References
 Maria Iolanda Palazzolo: "Mondadori, Arnaldo". In: Mario Caravale (ed.): Dizionario Biografico degli Italiani (DBI). Vol. 75: Miranda–Montano. Istituto della Enciclopedia Italiana, Rome 2011.

1889 births
1971 deaths
People from the Province of Mantua
Italian book publishers (people)